Atchison was a post office in Contra Costa County, California. Atchison was named after the Atchison, Topeka, and Santa Fe Railroad which had its western terminus at Point Richmond. The post office was closed in 1911.

References

Geography of Richmond, California